Retiro is the terminus station on Line E of the Buenos Aires Underground. The station is part of the larger Retiro railway station which connects to the Mitre, San Martín and Belgrano railways, as well as their corresponding commuter rail lines. The station was opened on 3 June 2019 as part of the extension of the line from Bolívar .

Overview
Passengers are able to transfer to the Retiro Station on Line C, and eventually Retiro Station on Line G and Retiro Station on Line H once they are completed.  It connects to the Retiro railway station which serves as the central terminal for the General San Martín Railway and General Mitre Railway and their respective commuter rail services, as well as the Belgrano Norte Line.

See also
Retiro bus station
Retiro railway station (Belgrano, Mitre, San Martín)
Retiro underground station (Line C, Line G, Line H)

References

Buenos Aires Underground stations